Gjendesheim Turisthytte has been a staffed lodge with Norwegian Mountain Touring Association (In Norwegian, Den Norske Turistforening – DNT) Oslo og Omegn as proprietor since 1878, and is located in the heart of the Norwegian mountains. The lodge can accommodate 170 guests in bedrooms with 1, 2 and 4 beds and four dormitories. The standard is simple; with bunks and joint shower/WC. 

Gjendesheim is situated at the east end of Gjende lake, 1000 meters above sea level by the in Vågå municipality. It is located about 2 km from Maurvangen off Riksvei 51.  

Gjendesheim is a popular starting point for hiking over Besseggen.  Hikers either take one of the ferry boats to Memurubu and hike back to Gejendesheim over Besseggen or alternatively start the hike at Gjendesheim and take the ferry boat back.

History
Originally Gjendesheim was planned for construction near Leirungen which is located further up towards Valdresflya.  When securing a lot proved impossible, Gjendesheim was constructed at its current location.

1868: The foundation of Norwegian Mountain Touring Association (DNT)
1873: DNTs first cairn marked path established from Memurudalen to Bessvatnet
1878: The opening of Gjendesheim 
1890: The first development and restoration with new cuisine, several renovations in 1898, 1904 - 05, 1910 - 11, 1916 and 1925
1937: New main building and renovation of dormitories
1974: Installation of electricity
1976: New extensive renovation

Hosts at Gjendesheim:
Anders Rusnes: 1878 - 1901
Kari Rusnes: 1901 - 1920
Ragnhild Repp: 1920 - 1950
Bjørg Hult Nystrøm: 1950 - 1952
Marit and Jens Skogstad: 1952 - 1958
Åslaug and Nils Vole: 1959 - 1974
Sonja and Olav Gaute Vole: 1975 - 1977
Olav Gaute Vole: 1977 - 1980
Bjørg Aaseng Vole and Olav Gaute Vole: 1980 - 2010
Marius Haugaløkken and Anne Katrin Taagvold: 2010 -

External links
Gjendesheim
Gjende Boats
The Norwegian Trekking Association information on Gjendesheim

Tourist huts in Norway
Jotunheimen